Little England is a historic plantation house located near Gloucester, Gloucester County, Virginia.  The plantation dates to a 1651 land grant to the Perrin family by Governor William Berkeley. Capt. John Perrin built the house on a point of land overlooking the York River directly across from Yorktown in 1716 with plans reputed to have been drawn by Christopher Wren. The house was used as a lookout for ships during the Battle of Yorktown. It is a -story, five bay, gable roofed brick dwelling in the Georgian style.  A -story frame wing was added in 1954. It has a single pile plan and two interior end chimneys. The brickwork is Flemish Bond with few glazed headers.  Little England is one of Virginia's least altered and best preserved colonial plantation homes. The interior features some of the finest colonial paneling in Virginia.

The house was restored in 1939.

It was added to the National Register of Historic Places in 1970.

References

External links
Little England, State Route 672 vicinity, Bena, Gloucester County, VA: 1 photo at Historic American Buildings Survey

See also

 Rosewell Plantation

Historic American Buildings Survey in Virginia
Plantation houses in Virginia
Houses on the National Register of Historic Places in Virginia
Georgian architecture in Virginia
Houses completed in 1775
Houses in Gloucester County, Virginia
National Register of Historic Places in Gloucester County, Virginia
1651 establishments in Virginia